Jevons Block: A Book of Sex Enmity is a poetry book by  published in 1917.

Contents
Described as "a small book of poetry," the publication is a collection of works by Buss that were first printed in various periodicals.

It was printed in Boston in 1917, by McGrath-Sherrill Press.

Reception
Jevons Block was called a modernized and gendered Spoon River by Linda Wagner-Martin.

References

Sources

External links

1917 poetry books
American poetry collections